William Cowlishaw (1 November 1839 – 29 March 1903) was a New Zealand cricketer. He played in one first-class match for Canterbury in 1864/65.

See also
 List of Canterbury representative cricketers

References

External links
 

1839 births
1903 deaths
New Zealand cricketers
Canterbury cricketers
Cricketers from Sydney